Amoeba is a studio album by electronic band Critters Buggin, released on October 19, 1999 on Loose Groove.

Track listing

Personnel
Matt Chamberlain - drums
Brad Houser - bass
Mike Dillon - percussion
Skerik - saxophones, keyboards, effects, vocals
Earl Harvin - bass loop and percussion on "Beaver Builds a Dam"

References

1999 albums
Critters Buggin albums